Kinarius was a fictitious legendary king of the Britons as recounted by Geoffrey of Monmouth.  He was son of Sisillius II and succeeded by his brother, Danius.

References

Legendary British kings